Fayette Township is located in Livingston County, Illinois. As of the 2010 census, its population was 271 and it contained 104 housing units.  Fayette Township formed from Belle Prairie Township on February 22, 1870.

Geography

Demographics

References

External links
US Census
City-data.com
Illinois State Archives

Townships in Livingston County, Illinois
Populated places established in 1870
Townships in Illinois
1870 establishments in Illinois